Hesler may refer to:

Mount Hesler, mount in the Selkirk Mountains of British Columbia, Canada
Georg Hesler (1427–1482), German Roman Catholic cardinal and bishop
Lexemuel Ray Hesler (1888–1977), American mycologist
Nicole Duval Hesler (born 1945), chief justice of Quebec